Popular science (also called pop-science or popsci) is an interpretation of science intended for a general audience. While science journalism focuses on recent scientific developments, popular science is more broad-ranging. It may be written by professional science journalists or by scientists themselves. It is presented in many forms, including books, film and television documentaries, magazine articles, and web pages.

History and role 
As early as 1830, astronomer John Herschel had recognized the need for the genre of popular science. In a letter to philosopher William Whewell, he wrote that the general public needed "digests of what is actually known in each particular branch of science... to give a connected view of what has been done, and what remains to be accomplished." Indeed, as the British population became not just increasingly literate but also well-educated, there was growing demand for science titles. Mary Somerville became an early and highly successful science writer of the nineteenth century. Her On the Connexion of the Physical Sciences (1834), intended for the mass audience, sold quite well. Arguably one of the first books in the genre of popular science, it contained few diagrams and very little mathematics. It had ten editions and was translated into multiple languages. It was the most popular science title from the publisher John Murray until On the Origin of Species (1859) by Charles Darwin.

Popular science is a bridge between scientific literature as a professional medium of scientific research, and the realms of popular political and cultural discourse. The goal of the genre is often to capture the methods and accuracy of science while making the language more accessible. Many science-related controversies are discussed in popular science books and publications, such as the long-running debates over biological determinism and the biological components of intelligence, stirred by popular books such as The Mismeasure of Man and The Bell Curve.

The purpose of scientific literature is to inform and persuade peers regarding the validity of observations and conclusions and the forensic efficacy of methods. Popular science attempts to inform and convince scientific outsiders (sometimes along with scientists in other fields) of the significance of data and conclusions and to celebrate the results. Statements in the scientific literature are often qualified and tentative, emphasizing that new observations and results are consistent with and similar to established knowledge wherein qualified scientists are assumed to recognize the relevance. By contrast, popular science emphasizes uniqueness and generality, taking a tone of factual authority absent from the scientific literature. Comparisons between original scientific reports, derivative science journalism, and popular science typically reveal at least some level of distortion and oversimplification which can often be quite dramatic, even with politically neutral scientific topics.

Popular science literature can be written by non-scientists who may have a limited understanding of the subject they are interpreting and it can be difficult for non-experts to identify misleading popular science, which may also blur the boundaries between real science and pseudoscience. However, sometimes non-scientists with a fair scientific background and strong technical communication skills can make good popular science writers because of their ability to put themselves in the layperson's place more easily.

Common threads 
Some usual features of popular science productions include:
 Entertainment value or personal relevance to the audience
 Emphasis on uniqueness and radicalness
 Exploring ideas overlooked by specialists or falling outside of established disciplines
 Generalized, simplified science concepts
 Presented for an audience with little or no science background, hence explaining general concepts more thoroughly
 Synthesis of new ideas that cross multiple fields and offer new applications in other academic specialties
 Use of metaphors and analogies to explain difficult or abstract scientific concepts

See also 
 List of popularizers of science
 List of popular science mass media outlets

Notes and references

General bibliography 
 Andreas W. Daum, Varieties of Popular Science and the Transformations of Public Knowledge: Some Historical Reflections". Isis. A Journal of the History of Science Society, 100 (June 2009), 319–332.
 McRae, Murdo William (editor). The Literature of Science: Perspectives on Popular Scientific Writing. The University of Georgia Press: Athens, 1993. .

External links